Arthur Rosman (26 November 1870 – 10 January 1948) was an Australian cricketer. He played in one first-class match for South Australia in 1898/99.

See also
 List of South Australian representative cricketers

References

External links
 

1870 births
1948 deaths
Australian cricketers
South Australia cricketers
Cricketers from Adelaide